Svetlana Haustova (born June 30, 1968) is a Russian ski-orienteering competitor. She won a bronze medal in the short distance at the 1996 World Ski Orienteering Championships in Lillehammer, and a silver medal with the Russian relay team.

References

Russian orienteers
Female orienteers
Ski-orienteers
Year of birth missing (living people)
Living people